Fern Hill is a neighborhood located in the southern part of Tacoma, Washington. It is generally defined as extending north to S. 72nd St, south to the city boundaries at 96th St, west to S. Sheridan Ave, and east to Pacific Avenue.

The neighborhood's main intersection is South 84th St. and S. Park Ave.  Fern Hill's central business district contains several small shops including Park Ave. Book Store, Fern Hill Coffee House, A Fine Design, InSpirations Massage, Norma's Barber Shop, Bill's Clock and Watch Repair, Le Le Nails, American Trophy, and Hand Crafted By Design.  The neighborhood also includes a postal branch, a public library branch, an elementary school, and a large church as well as several stately historic homes.

Fern Hill has one of the highest densities of neighborhood parks in the city, having three parks within four blocks of the neighborhood business district.

Neighborhoods in Tacoma, Washington